Aliceia aenigmatica is a species of sea snail, a marine gastropod mollusk in the family Raphitomidae.

Description
The length of the shell attains 3.4 mm, its diameter 1.8 mm.

Distribution
This marine species occurs off the Azores at bathyal depths (1800-1980 m).

References

 Gofas, S.; Le Renard, J.; Bouchet, P. (2001). Mollusca. in: Costello, M.J. et al. (eds), European Register of Marine Species: a check-list of the marine species in Europe and a bibliography of guides to their identification. Patrimoines Naturels. 50: 180-213

External links
 Dautzenberg P. & Fischer H. (1897). Dragages effectués par l'Hirondelle et par la Princesse Alice 1888-1896. Mémoires de la Société Zoologique de France. 139-234; pl. 3-7
 

aenigmatica
Gastropods described in 1897